The Gambling Fool is a 1925 silent Western film directed by J. P. McGowan starring Franklyn Farnum.

Plot
As described in a film magazine review, an honest gambler arrives at a tough town to meet the hard-hearted owner of a ranch. He wins the ranch and pays the back taxes on it in time to prevent it from being auctioned off. He finds an infant in the ranch house, rescuing it from the arch villain. He also protects the infant's aunt. Later, he overcomes the villains and triumphs in romance.

Cast

Preservation
This picture is preserved in the Library of Congress collection.

References

External links
 The Gambling Fool at IMDb.com
 

1925 films
Films directed by J. P. McGowan
1925 Western (genre) films
American black-and-white films
Silent American Western (genre) films
1920s American films